The 2019–20 season is Gimnasia y Esgrima's 8th consecutive season in the top division of Argentine football. In addition to the Primera División, the club are competing in the Copa Argentina and Copa de la Superliga.

The season generally covers the period from 1 July 2019 to 30 June 2020.

Review

Pre-season
Gimnasia y Esgrima's first occurrence of note arrived on 23 June 2019, as right-back Facundo Oreja ended his seven-year stint with them to join newly-promoted Primera B Nacional team Barracas Central. Sebastián Moyano also departed, with Unión Santa Fe snapping him up on 25 June. The club's appeared on the pitch for the opening time on 26 June, facing Everton of La Plata back-to-back at the Estancia Chica. A goal from Leandro Contín won them game one, before goals came from Lucas Calderón, Lucas Licht, Khalil Caraballo and José Paradela for a 5–0 win in game two. Days later, they played twice against Temperley; drawing 1–1 and winning 2–0. Diego Parini agreed to join GD Mirandês on 30 June. Ezequiel Bonifacio followed Moyano to Unión on 29 June.

Numerous loans from the previous campaign officially expired on and around 30 June. Santiago Silva left on 1 July, signing for Argentinos Juniors. Leonardo Morales and Maximiliano Caire came the other way, penning respective contracts from Santamarina and Defensa y Justicia. Lorenzo Faravelli secured a deal with Huracán on 2 July. Horacio Tijanovich scored as Gimnasia drew with Argentinos Juniors in a friendly on 3 July, prior to Jesús Vargas netting in the second match with the La Paternal outfit. Matías García sealed a return to Gimnasia on 3 July, after three years away with San Martín. Consecutive two-nil victories were recorded in friendlies with Fénix of the Uruguayan Primera División on 5 July. An offer from Genoa for Jan Hurtado was accepted on 9 July.

Gimnasia lost in two exhibition games on 10 July to Lanús. Hurtado, despite having an offer from Genoa accepted, completed a transfer to Boca Juniors on 11 July. Pablo Velázquez signed with the club later that day, penning terms from Nacional. Genoa's Claudio Spinelli arrived on loan on 15 July, twenty-four hours before to Marco Torsiglieri's incoming. Hernán Tifner and Daian García went to Huracán Las Heras on loan on 14 July. Maximiliano Comba, who was loaned in the previous season, received a permanent contract on 17 July, on a day that also saw them beat Atlético Chascomús across two friendlies.

July
Gimnasia y Esgrima started their competitive campaign on 20 July, as they lost in the Copa Argentina round of thirty-two to Defensa y Justicia; going out on penalties following a 1–1 at home. Earlier in the day, a Gimnasia shadow eleven took part in a friendly with Platense - losing by two. Matías García scored on his first league appearance back with Gimnasia on 28 July, as his goal got them a point away from home against Lanús. Janeiler Rivas, after a spell in India with NorthEast United, moved to Gimnasia on 31 July.

August
Brahian Alemán sealed a move in on 3 August from Al-Ettifaq, twelve months after he had joined the Saudi Arabian outfit from Gimnasia. After drawing versus Lanús, Gimnasia followed that up with a home loss at the hands of San Lorenzo on 4 August. Cristian Zone departed to Flandria on 8 August. Gimnasia played two thirty-minute friendlies with Independiente on 10 August, drawing initially before winning 2–0. On 14 August, it was reported that former player Santiago Silva had been provisionally suspended after he failed a drugs test; taken after a Copa de la Superliga match with Newell's Old Boys in April; Argentinos soon revealed Silva was going through fertility treatment at the time. Gianluca Simeone was loaned to Ibiza of Spain's Segunda División B on 13 August.

Gimnasia, on 19 August, lost 2–1 to Colón in the Primera División. Gonzalo Mottes signed for Defensores de Belgrano on 21 August. Gimnasia's losing run at the start their league campaign continued on 24 August, as Defensa y Justicia's Rafael Delgado scored to give his side the three points. A fourth straight loss arrived for Darío Ortiz's men on 31 August, with Argentinos Juniors defeating them at the Estadio Diego Armando Maradona in a fixture that also saw senior debutant Khalil Caraballo get sent off.

September
On 2 September, Gimnasia confirmed Darío Ortiz had mutually terminated his contract; with Leandro Martini and Mariano Messera coming in as joint-interim managers. Their stints lasted just days however, as 1986 FIFA World Cup winner Diego Maradona was unveiled as the new manager of Gimnasia on 5 September.

Squad

Transfers
Domestic transfer windows:3 July 2019 to 24 September 201920 January 2020 to 19 February 2020.

Transfers in

Transfers out

Loans in

Loans out

Friendlies

Pre-season
On 14 June 2019, Gimnasia y Esgrima announced friendlies with Temperley (2), Argentinos Juniors (2) and Lanús. With the latter encounter coming away from home, the other fixtures would be played at the Estadio Juan Carmelo Zerillo. Prior to facing them, the club scheduled games with local La Plata outfit Everton for 26 June. Friendlies with Uruguayan team Fénix and local team Atlético Chascomús were also set.

Mid-season
27 July saw Gimnasia y Esgrima face. Gimnasia and Independiente would face-off in Villa Domínico in friendlies on 10 August.

Competitions

Primera División

League table

Relegation table

Source: AFA

Results summary

Matches
The fixtures for the 2019–20 campaign were released on 10 July.

Copa Argentina

Domestic rivals Defensa y Justicia were the team Gimnasia y Esgrima were drawn to play in the round of thirty-two, at Temperley's Estadio Alfredo Beranger - it is usual for Copa Argentina matches to be played on neutral territory.

Copa de la Superliga

Squad statistics

Appearances and goals

Statistics accurate as of 31 August 2019.

Goalscorers

Notes

References

Club de Gimnasia y Esgrima La Plata seasons
Gimnasia y Esgrima